Kosarev is a Russian masculine surname; its feminine counterpart is Kosareva. Notable people with the surname include:

 Aleksandr Kosarev (volleyball) (born 1977), Russian volleyball player 
 Maxim Kosarev (born 1969), Russian trap shooter
 Aleksandr Kosarev (politician) (1903 – 1939), Russian Communist Party official, better known as first secretary of the Komsomol Central Committee

Russian-language surnames